A series of advertisements featuring the Bundaberg Rum bear, a polar bear known as Bundy R. Bear, was produced by advertising agency Leo Burnett to align the product 'with a larrikin approach to Australian mateship'. The Bundaberg Rum bear first appeared in 1961. It was designed to soften rum's aggressive image and broaden its appeal from the traditional older male drinker to a more sociable audience. 

The advertisements have been cited as a favourite among Australia's youth.
Bundaberg Rum has also been criticised for targeting its advertising towards young people and boys, through television commercials during NRL broadcasts, and other promotions.

See also

List of Australian and New Zealand advertising characters

References

External links

Australian mascots
Advertising characters
Fictional polar bears
Corporate mascots
Drink advertising characters
Male characters in advertising
Bear mascots
Mascots introduced in 1961
Bundaberg